The Del Bonita Border Crossing connects the town of Cut Bank, Montana with Del Bonita, Alberta on the Canada–US border. It is reached by Montana Secondary Highway 213 on the American side and Alberta Highway 62 on the Canadian side. The crossing was established in 1939, when the highway was completed.  At that time, the nearby crossing at Whiskey Gap was permanently closed. Today, there is little activity near this crossing on either side of the border, although the grass runway of the Whetstone International Airport runs along the boundary on the east side of the road. In 2012, the US replaced its border inspection station, which was built in 1962.

Although this is the 5th most used border crossing in Montana it is in the bottom 1/3 of all US border crossings and carries very little truck traffic.

Del Bonita Port GPS coordinates – Latitude & Longitude:  48.99863, -112.78841

Del Bonita U.S. Customs Office Telephone Number: 406-336-2130

See also
 List of Canada–United States border crossings

References
2. Del Bonita

Canada–United States border crossings
1939 establishments in Alberta
1939 establishments in Montana
Transportation in Glacier County, Montana
Buildings and structures in Glacier County, Montana
Cardston County